This is a partial discography of Giuseppe Verdi's opera, Aida. It was first performed at the Khedivial Opera House in Cairo on December 24, 1871.

Audio recordings

Video recordings

References
Notes

Sources
 

Opera discographies
Operas by Giuseppe Verdi